Weibo may refer to:
 Microblogging in China, or China-based microblogging services, including:
 NetEase Weibo, launched by NetEase
 People's Weibo, launched by People's Daily
 Phoenix Weibo, launched by Phoenix Television
 Weibo Corporation, which owns:
 Sina Weibo (weibo.com), launched by SINA Corporation, the most visited Chinese weibo service, and sometimes simply referred to as "Weibo".
 Sohu Weibo, launched by Sohu
 Tencent Weibo, launched by Tencent Holdings
 (more indexed on Microblogging in China#List)
 Weibo, Hebei, a town in Shijiazhuang, Hebei, China
 Weibo (Tang dynasty), a circuit in Chinese Tang Dynasty, northeast to the recent Daming County, Hebei, China